Charles Storer Storrow (25 March 1809 – 30 April 1904) was a prominent American civil engineer and industrialist. He is known for designing and building the dam and textile mill complex in Lawrence, Massachusetts.

Biography 
Charles Storer Storrow was born in Montréal, Canada, on March 25, 1809. From age 9 to 15 he attended Collége Royal de Bourbon (now Lycée Condorcet) in Paris, France, where his father had a business. In 1824 he returned to America and completed his secondary education at the Round Hill School.  He entered Harvard College as a sophomore in 1826 and graduated at the top of his class in 1829. His thesis was entitled Of the Celestial Motions.

On the advice of America's leading civil engineer at the time, Loammi Baldwin, he returned to Paris and spent two years (1830-1832) as an auditeur libre at École des Ponts et Chaussées  where he studied hydraulics under Gaspard de Prony and applied mechanics under Claude-Louis Navier.

Returning to America in 1832, Storrow joined the engineering staff of the Boston and Lowell Railroad and went on to become the railroad's business agent in 1836. In 1845 Storrow left the Boston and Lowell to become the chief engineer at the Essex Company, a company organized to harness the water power of the Merrimack River downstream from Lowell, Massachusetts. Storrow designed and built the Great Stone Dam across the Merrimack river, canals to distribute the water, several large textile mills, and a city, Lawrence, to house the mill workers. He came up with the idea to make roads that go to the mills in Lawrence, allowing him to become the first mayor of Lawrence in 1853.

Storrow's book, A Treatise on Water-Works for Conveying and Distributing Supplies of Water; with Tables and Examples, introduced American civil engineers to the mathematical theory of hydraulics and put America hydraulic engineering on a strong scientific basis.  Storrow also authored an extensive report on the Hoosac Tunnel and contributions to Lowell Hydraulic Experiments, a book by his protégé, James Bicheno Francis.

James J. Storrow, after whom Boston's Storrow Drive is named, was Charles Storrow's grandson.

Honors 
 Honorary Member, American Society of Civil Engineers
 Fellow, American Academy of Arts and Sciences

Further reading 
 Peter A. Ford, "Charles S. Storrow, Civil Engineer: A Case Study of European Training and Technological Transfer in the Antebellum Period," Technology and Culture, Vol. 34, No. 2 (Apr., 1993), pp. 271–299.
 Peter A. Ford, " 'Father of the Whole Enterprise': Charles S. Storrow and the Making of Lawrence, Massachusetts, 1845-1860," Massachusetts Historical Review, Vol. 2 (2000), pp. 76-117.
 Peter A. Ford, "An American in Paris: Charles S. Storrow and the 1830 Revolution," Proceedings of the Massachusetts Historical Society, Third Series, Vol. 104 (1992), pp. 21-41
 Peter M. Molloy, "Nineteenth-Century Hydropower: Design and Construction of Lawrence Dam, 1845-1848," Winterthur Portfolio, Vol. 15, No. 4 (Winter, 1980), pp. 315-343.
 Hiram F. Mills, "Charles Storer Storrow," Proceedings of the American Academy of Arts and Sciences, Vol. 40, No. 24 (July, 1905), pp. 769-773.
 Neil FitzSimons, "Charles S. Storrow and the Transition in American Hydraulics," Civil Engineering 38 (December 1968), pp. 81–82.
 Duncan E. Hay, "Building 'The New City on the Merrimack': The Essex Company and Its Role in the Creation of Lawrence, Massachusetts" (Ph.D. diss., University of Delaware, 1986).

References 

1809 births
1904 deaths
Lycée Condorcet alumni
Harvard College alumni
American civil engineers
Mayors of Lawrence, Massachusetts